FC Sochi may refer to:
FC Sochi-04, an association football club based in Sochi, Russia
FC Sochi 2013, a soccer team based in Sochi, Russia and was established on 2013
PFC Sochi, an association football club based in Sochi and was formed in 2018 on the base of FC Dynamo Saint Petersburg